Stenotarsus blatchleyi is a species of handsome fungus beetle in the family Endomychidae. It is found in North America.

References

Further reading

External links

 

Endomychidae
Articles created by Qbugbot
Beetles described in 1928